McGinnis Peak is a prominent peak,  high with a large, bare cirque in the north slope, near the edge of the Ross Ice Shelf, Antarctica. The peak was discovered by the United States Antarctic Service, 1939–41, was surveyed by A.P. Crary in 1957–58, and was named by him for Lyle McGinnis, a seismologist with the U.S. Victoria Land Traverse Party in 1958–59.

References

Mountains of the Ross Dependency
Dufek Coast